Berglund Center (originally called the Roanoke Civic Center) is a 10,500-seat multi-purpose arena located in the Williamson Road neighborhood of Roanoke, Virginia. It was built in 1971. It was the former home to the Roanoke Dazzle basketball team, as well as the Roanoke Express and Roanoke Valley Vipers ice hockey teams. Currently, it is the home of the Roanoke Rail Yard Dawgs of the Southern Professional Hockey League, Virginia Tech, Radford University and Roanoke College men's ice hockey teams.  The arena is also the home of the annual boys basketball games between Roanoke's two city high schools, Patrick Henry High School and William Fleming High School.

History 
Opened in October 1971, the Roanoke Civic Center was also the former home of the American Basketball Association (1967-1976) professional basketball franchise Virginia Squires. The Squires played there (in addition to the Norfolk Scope, Richmond Coliseum and Hampton Coliseum; all within the state of Virginia) from 1971 to 1972. The Virginia Squires used the Civic Center for only one season due to low attendance, before folding in 1976. Elvis Presley performed there in 1972, 1974, 1976, and was due to return in 1977, about a week after his death. It hosted 251 professional wrestling events between 1975 and 2013. WCW held Fall Brawl (1994) there  and Monday Nitro on March 31, 1997. WWE brought Monday Night Raw on December 1, 1997, May 6, 2013, and November 17, 2014. The 1977-1981 Southern Conference men's basketball tournaments were held there as well.

From 2001 to 2006, professional basketball was active again at the Roanoke Civic Center, with the National Basketball Association's D-League franchise, the Roanoke Dazzle. College basketball was also recently contested there, in the form of the Big South Conference men's basketball tournaments in 2001 and 2002. The Metro Conference men's basketball tournament was held here in 1991. The Southern Conference basketball tournament took place at the arena between 1977-1981. When both the Dazzle and Vipers folded after the 2005-06 season, the Roanoke Civic Center was left with 60 open dates to fill for the upcoming fall and winter. Eventually, nearly two-thirds of these open dates were awarded to the Virginia Tech, Radford University and Roanoke College hockey clubs, the arena's primary tenants until 2016, when the Mississippi Surge relocated to Roanoke, becoming the Rail Yard Dawgs.

Overview 
Built at the same time as the Scope and Richmond Coliseum, the Roanoke Civic Center is the area's premier sports and entertainment venue. There are eight restrooms and six concession stands at the arena, which has a  ceiling height and 10 spotlights as well as a portable stage that is no larger than 60-by-40 feet. The Eclipse forms the Coliseum's half-house configuration. The arena recently began a $6.2 million renovation project expected to last until 2016. The arena's heating system has been replaced, and plans call for upgrades to the arena's electrical system and to all arena entrances, as well as for all seats to be replaced.

The theatre features a -by-105-foot stage; 1,625 seats in the theatre are in the orchestra level, 295 in the loge and 520 in the balcony. After recent renovations, the facility became known as the Roanoke Performing Arts Theatre.

A  special events center was added to the Civic Center in 2007; it is used for trade shows, meetings, conventions and other special events. It can hold up to 3,066 seated, 5,850 standing.  The ceiling height is 32 feet.

Professional sports teams 
 Virginia Squires, American Basketball Association (1971–1976)
 Roanoke Express, East Coast Hockey League (1993–2004)
 Roanoke Steam, AF2 (2000–2002)
 Roanoke Dazzle, NBA G League (2001–2006)
 Roanoke Valley Vipers, United Hockey League (2005–2006)
 Roanoke Rail Yard Dawgs, Southern Professional Hockey League (2016–present)

References

External links
 

1971 establishments in Virginia
American Basketball Association venues
Basketball venues in Virginia
Buildings and structures in Roanoke, Virginia
College basketball venues in the United States
Convention centers in Virginia
Indoor ice hockey venues in the United States
Defunct NBA G League venues
Roanoke Dazzle
Sports in Roanoke, Virginia
Virginia Squires
Tourist attractions in Roanoke, Virginia
Sports venues completed in 1971
College ice hockey venues in the United States
Indoor arenas in Virginia